Djékanou Department is a department of Bélier Region in Lacs District, Ivory Coast. In 2021, its population was 37,281 and its seat is the settlement of Djékanou. The sub-prefectures of the department are Bonikro and Djékanou.

History
Djékanou Department was created in 2012 by dividing Toumodi Department.

Notes

Departments of Bélier
States and territories established in 2012
2012 establishments in Ivory Coast